A Fazenda 3 was the third season of the Brazilian reality television series A Fazenda which premiered Tuesday, September 28, 2010 at 11:15 p.m. on RecordTV.

The third season was confirmed on late–January 2010, before the finale of the second season. Britto Junior and Chris Couto reprise their hosting stints for the show, while Carolina Magalhães make her debut as the show's new special correspondent.

On December 21, 2010, model Daniel Bueno won the competition over actor Sérgio Abreu and model Lizi Benites with 44% of the final vote.

Production

Overview
There were fifteen celebrity contestants competing for the grand prize, making this the first season to have an odd number of original contestants.  The prize award was R$2,000,000 without tax allowances, the biggest prize in history of Brazilian reality television.

The season lasted 85 days, a decrease of four days over the previous season. Instead of the final two, this season was a final three facing the public vote on finale night.

Contestants
The cast list was officially unveiled at the launch night on Tuesday, September 28, 2010.
Biographical information according to Record official series site, plus footnoted additions.
(ages stated are at time of contest)

Future appearances
In 2011, Monique Evans was contender to be a competitor on A Fazenda 4. She won the public vote and finished the season as runner-up.

In 2015, Nany People appeared in A Fazenda 8 as a guest to give the remained competitors a letter from week 4 eliminated celebrity.

In 2018, Dudu Pelizzari appeared in Dancing Brasil 3, he finished in 6th place in the competition.

Voting history

Notes

References

External links
 Official Site 

2010 Brazilian television seasons
A Fazenda